Kenyacus ruwenzorii is a species of ground beetle in the subfamily Harpalinae first described by Charles Alluaud in 1917.

References

Harpalinae
Beetles described in 1917